The 1952 Maryland Terrapins football team represented the University of Maryland in 1951 college football season as a member of the Southern Conference (SoCon). However, during the 1952 season, Maryland underwent sanctions by the Southern Conference that disallowed the team from playing any conference opponents. This was in response to Maryland's violation of a newly instituted ban on postseason play the year prior by its participation in the 1952 Sugar Bowl. Jim Tatum served as the head coach for the sixth season of his nine-year tenure. The team compiled a 7–2 record The loss against 14th-ranked Mississippi ended Maryland's school-record 22-game winning streak. After the season, Maryland left the Southern Conference in order to become a founding member of the Atlantic Coast Conference (ACC).

Schedule

Personnel

Coaching staff
Jim Tatum, head coach
Bob Ward, line coach
Jack Hennemier, defensive line coach
Warren Giese, ends coach
Tommy Mont, backfield coach
Eddie Teague, defensive backfield coach
Emmett Cheek, freshman coach
Vern Seibert, assistant freshman coach
Duke Wyre, head trainer
John Lacey, assistant trainer

Footnotes

References

Maryland
Maryland Terrapins football seasons
Maryland Terrapins football